Belarus participated at the 2017 Summer Universiade in Taipei, Taiwan with 2 competitors in 2 sports.

Competitors 
The following table lists Bolivia's delegation per sport and gender.

Athletics

Women

Track & road events

Swimming

Men

References 

Nations at the 2017 Summer Universiade
2017 in Bolivian sport